Bruno Luiz de Almeida Rodrigues (born September 9, 1984, in Rio de Janeiro), known as just Bruno Luiz, is a Brazilian football forward. He most recently played in the Madureira.

Bruno Luiz previously played for Juventude in the Campeonato Brasileiro and also played for Al-Raed in the Saudi Premier League.

References

1984 births
Living people
Brazilian footballers
Brazilian expatriate footballers
Footballers from Rio de Janeiro (city)
Macaé Esporte Futebol Clube players
Madureira Esporte Clube players
Al-Raed FC players
Expatriate footballers in Saudi Arabia
Brazilian expatriate sportspeople in Saudi Arabia
Association football forwards